Azure is a variation of blue that is often described as the color of the sky on a clear day.

On the RGB color wheel, "azure" (hexadecimal #0080FF) is defined as the color at 210 degrees, i.e., the hue halfway between blue and cyan. In the RGB color model, used to create all the colors on a television or computer screen, azure is created by adding a little green light to blue light. The complementary color of azure is orange.

Azure (web color)

In the X11 color system which became a standard for early web colors, azure is depicted as a pale cyan or whitish cyan rather than a shade of azure.

In an artistic context, this color could also be called azure mist or cyan mist.

Variations of azure
In this section, the term shade is used in its technical sense as used in color theory, meaning a blueish color mixed with black or dark gray. The colors arranged in order of their value (brightness) (V in the HSV code), the brighter colors toward the top and the darker colors toward the bottom.

Alice blue

The web color Alice blue is a pale tint of azure.

Light sky blue

Displayed at right is the web color light sky blue.

Baby blue

Baby blue is known as one of the pastel colors.

This color is associated with baby boys in Western culture.

The first recorded use of baby blue as a color name in English was in 1892.

Sky blue

Displayed at right is the web color sky blue.

The first recorded use of sky blue as a color name in English was in 1728 in the Cyclopædia of Ephraim Chambers. Prior to the Chambers reference, the color had first been used in 1585 in a book by Nicolas de Nicolay where he stated "the tulbant of the merchant must be skie coloured".

Deep sky blue

Deep sky blue is an azure-cyan color associated with deep sky blue.

Deep sky blue (Capri) is a web color.

This color is on the color wheel (RGB/HSV color wheel) halfway between azure and cyan.

The traditional name for this color is Capri.

The first use of Capri as a color name in English was in 1920.

The color Capri in general is named for the azure-cyan color of the Mediterranean Sea around the island of Capri off Italy, the site of several villas belonging to the Roman Emperor Tiberius, including his imperial residence in his later years, the Villa Jovis. Specifically, the color Capri is named after the color of the Blue Grotto on the island of Capri as it appears on a bright sunny day. Today the island of Capri is a resort island popular with tourists.

The name deep sky blue for this color did not come into use until the promulgation of the X11 color list in 1987.

The name Capri is still used for this color as well as the name deep sky blue.

Cerulean

The first recorded use of cerulean as a color name in English was in 1590.

The word is probably derived from the Latin word caeruleus, "dark blue, blue, or blue-green", which in turn probably derives from caelulum, diminutive of caelum, "heaven, sky".

Pale azure

Green-blue

Green-blue was a Crayola color from 1958 to 1990.

Maya blue

Maya blue was a pigment widely used by the Mayan civilization.

Jordy blue

At right is displayed the color jordy blue.

The color name jordy blue has been in use since 2001, when this color was promulgated as one of the colors on the Xona.com Color List.

Columbia blue

Columbia blue is a medium light tone of azure named after Columbia University. The typical Columbia blue is defined by Pantone Columbia Blue (PANTONE 290).

Picton blue

At right is displayed the color picton blue.

The color name picton blue dates back to at least 2001, and came into wider use when the Resene Paints colors were used as one of the sources for the Xona Games Color List.

United Nations blue

Displayed at right is the color United Nations blue.

The color resembles the shade of blue seen on the flag of the United Nations.

Cornflower blue

At right is displayed the web color cornflower blue.

Bleu de France

The color bleu de France is displayed at right.

Bleu de France is a color that has been associated in heraldry with the Kings of France since the 12th century.

Dodger blue

At right is displayed the color Dodger blue.

Brandeis blue

Brandeis blue is the tone of azure used in association with Brandeis University.

The university administration defines Brandeis blue as corresponding to the Pantone color of 294 or the process color of 100c 86m 14y w24k.

True blue

The color true blue is a deep tone of azure that is the color of the uniforms of the sports teams of UCLA. It is also one of the shades of blue used by the Los Angeles Chargers though they use the name powder blue.

Tang blue

The color tang blue is a deep tone of azure that is the color of royal blue tang fish.

Royal blue (web color)

The web color royal blue is a rich tone of azure.

Celestial blue

Displayed at right is the color celestial blue.

The first recorded use of celestial blue as a color name in English was in 1535.

The source of this color is the Plochere Color System, a color system formulated in 1948 that is widely used by interior designers.

Vista blue 

Displayed at right is the color vista blue.

The source of this color is the "Pantone Textile Paper eXtended (TPX)" color list, color #15-3930 TPX—Vista Blue.

Silver Lake blue 

Displayed at right is the color Silver Lake blue.

The source of this color is the "Pantone Textile Paper eXtended (TPX)" color list, color #17-4030 TPX—Silver Lake Blue.

Tufts blue

Tufts blue is the tone of azure used in association with Tufts University.

Honolulu blue

Honolulu blue is the tone of azure used in association with the Detroit Lions football team.

Air Force blue

Displayed at right is the color air force blue, also known as RAF blue. This is the tone of air force blue used by the Royal Air Force, the first air force to choose an "air force blue" color by which to identify itself, in 1920.

The color "air force blue" is a medium tone of azure since it has a hue code of 204 which is a hue code between 195 and 225, signifying a tone of azure.

Steel blue

Steel blue is a grayish tone of azure that resembles the color blue steel, i.e., steel which has been subjected to bluing in order to protect it from rust.

The first recorded use of steel blue as a color name in English was in 1817.

French blue

French blue is a deep azure color commonly used in quality men's dress shirts.

According to the Oxford English Dictionary, the first use of  French Blue in English was in The Times of 1802.

Lapis lazuli

The color lapis lazuli is displayed at left.

Lapis Lazuli is a color that is a representation of the most common color of lapis lazuli.

Royal blue (traditional)

The traditional color called royal blue is a dark shade of azure.

Light blue

The web color light blue is part of the X11 color system, with a hue code of 194. This color is closer to cyan than to blue. Variations of this color are known as sky blue, baby blue, or angel blue.

The first recorded use of "light blue" as a color term in English is in the year 1915.

Baby blue

Baby blue is known as one of the pastel colors. With a hue code of 199, this color is a tone of azure.

The first recorded use of baby blue as a color name in English was in 1892.

Blue (NCS) (psychological primary blue)

The color defined as blue in the NCS or Natural Color System is an azure-like color shown at right (NCS 2060-B). The Natural Color System is a color system based on the four unique hues or psychological primary colors red, yellow, green, and blue. The NCS is based on the opponent process theory of vision.

The “Natural Color System” is widely used in Scandinavia.

Blue (Munsell)

The color defined as blue in the Munsell color system (Munsell 5B) is shown at right. The Munsell color system is a color space that specifies colors based on three color dimensions: hue, value (lightness), and chroma (color purity), spaced uniformly (according to the logarithmic scale which governs human perception) in three dimensions in the Munsell color solid, which is shaped like an elongated oval at an angle. In order for all the colors to be spaced uniformly, it was found necessary to use a color wheel with five primary colors: red, yellow, green, blue, and purple.

Munsell can only be displayed approximately on a computer screen, as these spectral colors have been adjusted to fit into the sRGB gamut. In the 21st century, this hue is classified as an intermediate between azure and cyan.

Uranian blue

Uranian blue is a light greenish blue, the color of Uranus.

Spanish blue

Spanish blue is the color that is called Azul (the Spanish word for "blue") in the Guía de coloraciones (Guide to colorations) by Rosa Gallego and Juan Carlos Sanz, a color dictionary published in 2005 that is widely popular in the Hispanophone realm. It is a shade of azure.

Argentinian blue

The web color Argentinian blue is a light azure color seen on the national flag of Argentina.

Berkeley blue

Berkeley Blue is one of the official colors of the University of California, Berkeley, along with California Gold.  Until 2007, the university had used Yale Blue in its place, given Berkeley's historical ties to Yale University, particularly in its founding. Berkeley's school colors are the originators for those of all the campuses in the University of California system, of which Berkeley is the oldest as its flagship.

Blue (Crayola)

Blue (Crayola) is the color called blue in Crayola crayons.

"Blue" was one of the original Crayola crayons formulated in 1903.

Ruddy blue

Ruddy blue represents the coloring of the beak of the ruddy duck. It is a light shade of azure.

Celtic blue 

Celtic blue is a shade of blue, also known as glas celtig in Welsh, or gorm ceilteach in both the Irish language and in Scottish Gaelic. Julius Caesar reported (in Commentarii de Bello Gallico) that the Britanni used to colour their bodies blue with vitrum, a word that means primarily "glass", but also the domestic name for the "woad" (Isatis tinctoria), besides the Gaulish loanword glastum (from Proto-Celtic *glastos "green"). The connection seems to be that both glass and the woad are "water-like" (lat. vitrum is from Proto-Indo-European *wed-ro- "water-like").

Polynesian blue

Polynesian blue is a dark blue color, almost navy.

Moroccan Blue

Moroccan blue (also Chefchaouen blue) is a vivid blue color.

Yale Blue

Yale Blue is the dark azure color used in association with Yale University. The hue of Yale Blue is one of the two official colors of Indiana State University, the University of Mississippi, and Southern Methodist University. The official color "DCU Blue" of Dublin City University is very close to Yale Blue.

Yale Blue was also an official color of University of California, Berkeley and Duke University.

Penn blue

Penn Blue is one of the official colors of the University of Pennsylvania, along with Penn Red. While the school colors were defined by 1910, university history points to earlier times when the colors may have been chosen, including a possible visit by George Washington to the University, where students used the color of his tunic to determine school colors or a track meet where Penn athletes declared that they would wear the colors "of the teams we beat," which would be those of both Harvard University and Yale University. Originally defined as the colors used on the American flag, the colors have since deviated.

Sapphire 

Sapphire is a deep shade of navy blue, based on the color of an average sapphire gemstone. However, sapphires can also be pink, yellow, or orange.

Delft blue

Delft blue is a dark blue color.  The name is derived from the Dutch pottery Delftware, also known simply as "Delft Blue".

Resolution blue

Resolution blue is a vivid blue color. This color name first came into use in 2001 when it was formulated as one of the colors on the Xona.com Color List.

See also
RAL 5009 Azure blue

References

 
 Shades of Blue
 Shades of Cyan